There are currently  games in this table across all pages: A to C, D to I, J to P, and Q to Z. It does not include PlayStation minis, PS one Classics or PS2 Classics.

Notes

References 

3 games (D-I)
D-I
Video game lists by platform